DDC Mlimani Park Orchestra (Mlimani Park for short) has been one of the most popular Tanzanian muziki wa dansi bands.

Mlimani Park Orchestra was founded in 01-Aug-1978 by former Juwata Jazz Band members Muhiddin Maalim, Abdallah Gama, Cosmas Chidumule, Joseph Mulenga Michael Enoch and Abel Balthazar; they were later joined by Hassan Bitchuka and Suleiman Mwanyiro from Juwata Jazz Band. They started as the resident band of the Tanzania Transport & Taxi Services owned Mlimani Park Bar in Dar es Salaam, the organization that also managed the band. When Tanzania Transport & Taxi Services went bankrupt around 1982, the bar and management of the band were taken over by the Dar es Salaam Development Corporation (DDC), part of the city council, and the band became DDC Mlimani Park Orchestra.

In the 1980s, Mlimani Park released a string of very popular hits, mostly written by Bitchuka, Cosmas Chidumule, and Shaaban Dede.

With respect to other muziki wa dansi bands of the 1980s such as Vijana Jazz, that was known for its technical innovations (e.g., electronic instruments) or and Orchestra Maquis Original, that frequently changed their  (style), Mlimani Park stuck with the dansi tradition. In their long career they remained faithful to a single , called , which in turn was inspired by traditional Tanzanian dances.

Partial discography

Albums
 Sikinde (collection of hits, Africassette 9402)
 Sungi (Popular African Music 403)

Contributing artist
 The Rough Guide to the Music of Kenya and Tanzania (World Music Network RGNET 1007)
 The Rough Guide To Psychedelic Africa (World Music Network RGNET 1270)

References

External links
Mlimani Park Orchestra - Jahazi-Media
Discography of Mlimani Park Orchestra and The Black Warriors

Tanzanian musical groups